France Industrie is a professional organisation and lobby created in 2018, managed by Alexandre Saubot since the end of 2020. Its aim is to promote the industry in France and to represent the sector and its members.

In 2020, the organisation has 67 members, including 44 major French private and public companies and 23 industry sector federations.

History 
France Industrie has been created in early 2018 by bringing together two pre-existing organisations, the Cercle de l'Industrie and the Groupe des fédérations industrielles (GFI). Its aim is to centralise French industrial communication, following the example of its German (BDI) and Italian (Confindustria) counterparts.

The first president of France Industrie is Philippe Varin, former president of the Cercle de l'Industrie, and the vice-president is Philippe Darmayan, former president of GFI. In November 2020, Alexandre Saubot, the CEO of a medium-sized company, took over the presidency.

Organization

Members 
France Industrie brings together 44 private and public companies from all industrial sectors, as well as 23 sectoral federations that are members of the MEDEF.

Board of Directors 
The Board of Directors of the organisation is composed of 7 Presidents of the College of Industrial Companies, as well as 7 Presidents of the College of Industrial Federations. The President is Alexandre Saubot (CEO of Haulotte).

Lobbying activity

With the European Union institutions 
France industrie has been registered in the European Commission's transparency register for interest representatives since 2009, and in 2018 declared annual expenses of between €50,000 and €100,000 for this activity.

In France 
France industrie declares to the Haute Autorité pour la transparence de la vie publique that it carries out lobbying activities in France for an amount not exceeding 400,000 euros for the year 2019.

References

External links
 

Lobbying
Industry in France
Political advocacy groups in Europe
Organizations established in 2018